"We No Speak Americano" is a song by Australian band Yolanda Be Cool and producer DCUP. It was released on the independent Australian label Sweat It Out on 27 February 2010. The song samples the 1956 Italian song "Tu Vuò Fà L'Americano" in the Neapolitan language by Renato Carosone, written by Carosone and Nicola Salerno. "We No Speak Americano" became a hit in Europe, Australia, and South America (where the song is also known as Pa-Panamericano) as well as a top 40 hit in the U.S. and Canada. It also won the 2010 ARIA award for "Best Dance Release." The song had sold over 1 million digital copies in the United States 

The song was featured on the soundtrack of the 2011 films The Inbetweeners Movie and Hop, the 2012 film Madagascar 3: Europe's Most Wanted, the 2013 film The Great Beauty and the 2018 film Peter Rabbit. It also featured in Episode 2 of the 2011 Korean drama adaptation City Hunter and on the video games Zumba Fitness 2 and Just Dance 4. "We No Speak Americano" was later sampled by Cuban American rapper Pitbull for his Spanish-language tune "Bon, Bon", crediting Yolanda Be Cool and DCUP as producers of his song. American gymnast Gabby Douglas used the song in her gold medal-winning final floor routine at the 2012 Summer Olympics in London.

Composition 
The song is performed in the key of B minor with a tempo of 125 beats per minute in cut time.  The vocals in the song span from A4 to E5.

Music video
The official music video for the song, directed by Andy Hylton is a take on classic silent film comedies and features a Chaplinesque Italian protagonist during 1910s New York City, in a bid to raise some quick cash to propose to the young woman that he met earlier in the video.

This music video appeared in an episode of Beavis and Butthead.

Cover versions
 The Chipettes covered this song for the Alvin and the Chipmunks: Chipwrecked: Music from the Motion Picture album and in Alvin and the Chipmunks: Chipwrecked. This version is mashed with Miami Sound Machine's "Conga".
 For the video game Just Dance 4, a cover by in-house artists was produced. Said artists are credited as "Hit the Electro Beat". The same name was later used for the cover of "Blue (Da Ba Dee)" in Just Dance 2018, then of "Mi Mi Mi" in Just Dance 2019.

Credits and personnel
Lead vocals – Renato Carosone
Lyrics – Johnson Peterson, Sylvester Martinez, Duncan Maclennan, Renato Carosone, Nicola Salerno
Producer – Johnson Peterson, Sylvester Martinez, Duncan Maclennan
Mastering engineer – Robin Petras (PureFocus Mastering)

Charts

Weekly charts

Year-end charts

Certifications

Other versions

Marco Calliari version
In the United Kingdom, a cover version sung by Quebec-born Italian singer-songwriter Marco Calliari entered and peaked at number 26 on the UK Singles Chart.

Russian Parody
In Russia, a parody version of the track appeared in the summer 2010, with vocals in Russian by the band Трикотаж (Knit-Wear) featuring Dj Solovey.  This version was entitled Подзаебало (Sick of it), with the lyrics па-падзаебало mirroring pa-parle americano of the original.  The new lyrics make references to the record heat wave in Russia of summer 2010, The Twilight Saga, Lady Gaga, and other current socio-cultural events.

"Por Panamericana" and "El Chocoano" 
In Argentina, various parody versions of the song were made. Among them, one resulted in very successful hit, that would even be played at discos as a companion for the original song. The best-known version is called "Por Panamericana", and the voice recorded on the record tell a story about being stopped by the police at the Panamerican Highway for speeding. Los Cantores de Chipuco (Colombia) also made their own parody of this song, called "El Chocoano".

"Bi Bi pro Americano" 
After Benjamin Netanyahu's speech to the United States Congress, Noy Alooshe spoofed it by using parts of the speech to the tune of "We No Speak Americano".

Hand dance video
In July 2010, Irish dancers Suzanne Cleary and Peter Harding (who perform as the group Up and Over It) released a music video filmed by Jonny Reed. Using "We No Speak Americano" as background music, the video features Cleary and Harding performing an elaborately choreographed tabletop dance using only their hands and arms, and wearing deadpan expressions throughout the song. By July 2020 it had been watched 10.257.000 times.

"We No Speak Huttese"
A parody of the song titled "We No Speak Huttese" can be found in Kinect Star Wars for the Xbox 360 Kinect peripheral. It is featured in the Galactic Dance Off mini game. The vocals are replaced with Jabba the Hutt's and the instrumentals are recreated in the style of the Max Rebo Band.

"Angry (We No Speak Americano)"
Korean idol group LPG covered the song in 2011.

See also
List of number-one club tracks of 2021 (Australia)
List of Romanian Top 100 number ones of the 2010s

References

External links

2009 songs
2010 singles
ARIA Award-winning songs
Electro swing songs
Dutch Top 40 number-one singles
European Hot 100 Singles number-one singles
Irish Singles Chart number-one singles
Number-one singles in Austria
Number-one singles in Denmark
Number-one singles in Finland
Number-one singles in Germany
Number-one singles in Hungary
Number-one singles in Israel
Number-one singles in Romania
Number-one singles in Scotland
Number-one singles in Sweden
Number-one singles in Switzerland
UK Singles Chart number-one singles
Ultratop 50 Singles (Wallonia) number-one singles
Ultratop 50 Singles (Flanders) number-one singles
Songs about the United States
Songs written by Nicola Salerno
Ultra Music singles